The Piaggio P.IX, or Piaggio Stella P.IX, was an Italian nine-cylinder radial aircraft engine produced by Rinaldo Piaggio S.p.A. Based on the Gnome-Rhône 9K, the engine was rated at . Production was used to power a number of other aircraft developed in Italy. The main users were the Savoia-Marchetti SM.81 transport and the IMAM Ro.37bis, the main reconnaissance aircraft in the Regia Aeronautica during the Second Italo-Ethiopian War, Spanish Civil War and Second World War, but the engine was also used by other designs, including the prototype Savoia-Marchetti SM.79.

Design and development
Piaggio acquired a license from Gnome et Rhône in 1925 for their engines derived from the Bristol Jupiter and, in 1933, brought out a developed version, created under the direction of engineer Renzo Spolti.  The engine had nine cylinders and was therefore named P.IX. It was one of a range of Piaggio radial engines named Stella, or Star, all based on the same radial design.

The engine had cylinders that had steel barrels and aluminium heads. Aluminium alloy pistons were connected to a split crankshaft via articulated connecting rods. The valves were enclosed. Each cylinder retained the same bore and stroke as the Gnome-Rhône 9K,  and  respectively. However, it was more powerful and was rated at  when fitted with a supercharger.

The engine was used to power aircraft that served during the Second Italo-Ethiopian War, Spanish Civil War and Second World War, including one hundred and forty Savoia-Marchetti SM.81s, a Regia Aeronautica transport, and the majority of the production of the IMAM Ro.37bis reconnaissance aircraft. Most had retired by 1943.

Variants
P.IX R. Normally aspirated and geared.
P.IX R.C. Supercharged and geared.

Applications
 CANT Z.504
 CANT Z.506 prototype
 Caproni Ca.131
 Caproni Ca.132
 Caproni Ca.301
 Caproni Ca.305
 Caproni CH.1
 IMAM Ro.37bis
 IMAM Ro.43 prototype
 Piaggio P.10bis
 Piaggio P.16
 Savoia-Marchetti S.73
 Savoia-Marchetti SM.79 prototype
 Savoia-Marchetti SM.81

Specifications (R.C.40)

See also

References

Citations

Bibliography
 
 
 
 
 
 
 
 
 

1930s aircraft piston engines
Air-cooled aircraft piston engines
P.IX